Carroll Leach Meins was a political figure who served as a member of the Massachusetts House of Representatives, Chairman of the Massachusetts Republican Party, and Collector of Customs for the Port of Boston.

Early life
Meins was born on October 22, 1892 in Boston.  He attended Boston Public Schools and graduated from the High School of Commerce in 1911.

During World War I, Meins enlisted as a First Lieutenant in the Quartermaster Corps of the United States Army. He served eighteen months in the American Expeditionary Forces in France.

After the war, Meins served as treasurer of the Sparrow and Meins Chocolate Company.

Political career

State representative
Meins was a member of the Massachusetts House of Representatives from 1923 to 1929. During his tenure he was chairman of the House Committee on Taxation and was a member of the Committee on Rules.

Party leader
In 1937 he was elected Chairman of the Boston Republican Committee.

On May 4, 1938 Meins was elected Chairman of the state Republican Party. During his tenure as Chairman, Republican Leverett Saltonstall was elected Governor of Massachusetts. Saltonstall chose Meins to serve as Secretary to the Governor. He was succeeded as party chairman by George W. Schryver on December 14, 1938.

Saltonstall administration
Meins served as chief secretary to Governor Saltonstall from January 5, 1939 to December 11, 1940 when he accepted an appointment to the State Public Utilities Commission.

Bradford administration
In 1947, Meins was appointed by Robert F. Bradford to head the newly created Metropolitan Transit Authority. Although Meins had a ten-year term, on January 5, 1949, he and the four other members of the Metropolitan Transit Authority Board of Trustees resigned, as they believed incoming Governor Paul A. Dever was entitled to appoint his own board. Dever had been expected to remove the trustees, as the MTA system had run a $9 million deficit under their leadership.

Collector of Customs
In 1953, Meins was appointed by President Dwight D. Eisenhower to serve as Collector of Customs for the Port of Boston. He died on September 14, 1953 at Massachusetts General Hospital in Boston.

See also
 1923–1924 Massachusetts legislature
 1925–1926 Massachusetts legislature
 1927–1928 Massachusetts legislature

References

1892 births
1953 deaths
Businesspeople in confectionery
Massachusetts Republican Party chairs
Republican Party members of the Massachusetts House of Representatives
Politicians from Boston
Collectors of the Port of Boston
20th-century American politicians